Zygnemopsis desmidioides is a species of alga belonging to the family Zygnemataceae.

Synonyms:
 Debarya desmidioides West & G.S.West [= basionym]

References

Zygnemataceae